The Piano Lesson is a 1995 American television film based on the play The Piano Lesson by August Wilson.  Produced by Hallmark Hall of Fame, the film originally aired on CBS on February 5, 1995.  Directed by Lloyd Richards, the film stars Charles S. Dutton and Alfre Woodard, and relies on most of its cast from the original Broadway production.

On September 30, 2020, it was announced that Denzel Washington is planning a new film adaptation for Netflix. Filming is expected to begin Summer 2021 in Pittsburgh.

Plot
Boy Willie (Charles S. Dutton) and his friend Lymon (Courtney B. Vance) travel from Mississippi to Pittsburgh, where he wishes his sister Berniece (Alfre Woodard) will give him the family's heirloom piano so that he can sell it to buy land from Mr. Sutter (Tim Hartman), a descendant of the family that once owned Willie's own ancestors as slaves.  The piano itself had at one time belonged to the wife of the original Sutter, the white former owner of their family... and decades earlier, Berniece and Boy Willie's grandfather had, at the slave master's instructions, carved the black family's African tribal history and American slave history into the piano's surface.

When Boy Willie arrives, his Uncle Doaker (Carl Gordon) tells Willie that Berniece won't part with the piano.  Berniece's boyfriend Avery (Tommy Hollis) and her Uncle Wining Boy (Lou Myers) also attempt for reasons of their own to get Berniece to sell.  As selling the piano would be like turning her back on their people and their past, Berniece continues to refuse.

Cast
 Charles S. Dutton as Boy Willie
 Alfre Woodard as Berniece Charles
 Carl Gordon as Doaker
 Tommy Hollis as Avery
 Lou Myers as Wining Boy
 Courtney B. Vance as Lymon
 Zelda Harris as Maretha
 Tim Hartman as Sutter
 Rosalyn Coleman as Grace
 Tommy Lafitte as Ace
 Lynne Innerst as Miss Ophelia
 Harold Surratt as Papa Willie Boy
 Elva Branson as Mama Berniece
 Ben Tatar as Watermelon Man
 Alice Eisner as Watermelon Lady
 Bob Tracey as Nolander

Recognition
DVD Verdict wrote that the "excellent writing leaps off the screen." While noting that most TV films seem geared "towards the lowest common Nielsen family demographic", they write that "something crafted, filled with inordinate drama and rich, dimensional characters just blares across the airwaves, filling up your deepest, hungry cinematic aesthetic," and that this recognition is the case for the Hallmark Hall of Fame adaptation of August Wilson's Pulitzer Prize winning play The Piano Lesson.  They noted that Wilson has been long known for "profound, deeply moving portraits of African Americans in the United States," and that he  "understands the issues facing minorities better than most modern playwrights do."  They called the film a "brilliant analog," and a "fable of magic realism."

TV Guide wrote that the film is "a wrenching but flawed cable adaptation of August Wilson's play," and that while the film was another Wilson "folk tale about the legacy of slavery," that "Sadly, this particular production fails to make any psychological or ectoplasmic ghosts come alive for the audience."  They noted this was not because the film did not make the playwright's message clear, the problem was in "its obviousness" in that Wilson belabored his points.

Awards and nominations

References

External links

1995 television films
1995 films
Films directed by Lloyd Richards
Films scored by Stephen James Taylor
Films set in Pittsburgh
Hallmark Hall of Fame episodes
Peabody Award-winning broadcasts